Brigadier Ravi Datt Mehta (1955 – 7 July 2008) was a brigadier in the Indian army. He died in the suicide bombing of the Indian Embassy in Kabul while serving as India's Defence Attaché to Afghanistan on 7 July 2008.

Early life and military career
Indian Express states that he was a math wizard in his younger days. He joined the Indian Army in 1976 and went on to become a highly rated officer. His selection as Defence Attaché in Kabul is said to have followed an intensive screening process that shortlists the candidate pool to unofficially the "top three" officers of the Indian Army, prior to making the final selection for the job .
He had proficiency in many languages including Pashto, Mandarin and Tibetan. His work as defence attache in Kabul was praised in both Indian media and Pakistani media. In the words of a columnist of the Dawn newspaper, he was:
"an affable defence attaché who was popular with Indian expatriates and local Afghans alike"

It is speculated that he was targeted, allegedly by the Taliban and the ISI, due to his significant role in training the Afghan army and his close monitoring of the re-established links between Pakistan's Inter Services Intelligence (ISI) and the Taliban. He was said to have a "good relationship" with Afghan defence minister Abdul Rahim Wardak. Brig. Mehta had earlier also served as the head of the Indian Army's Intelligence Corps in the state of Jammu and Kashmir.

Legacy and honours

A road in his hometown Simla near his childhood home is now named after him. He is also slated to be posthumously awarded the Kirti Chakra, India's second-highest peacetime gallantry award. His funeral was attended by Chief of Army Staff General Deepak Kapoor, Chief of Naval Staff Admiral Suresh Mehta and Chief of the Air Staff Fali Homi Major.

Brigadier Mehta's wife was also working in Afghanistan for empowerment of women during his stay there.  Brigadier Mehta has a son who is also serving in the Indian Air Force as a fighter pilot.

References

1955 births
2008 deaths
Indian Army officers
Indian expatriates in Afghanistan
Kirti Chakra
Recipients of the Kirti Chakra
Indian military attachés